Dennis Hayden may refer to: 
 Dennis Hayden (actor)
 Dennis Hayden (gymnast)